Nebenan is a social media platform for interactions in a user's neighborhood area.

History
It includes neighborhoods in a number cities in Germany, Spain, France and Italy. The network is run by Good Hood GmbH and was created in 2015.

References 

German social networking websites